Delamere Station is a pastoral lease that operates as a cattle station in the Northern Territory of Australia.

It is composed of undulating to hilly terrain with basaltic black soil supporting Flinders and Mitchell grass. The creek and river systems grow blue, sardie and stylos grasses.

The station is currently owned by the Australian Agricultural Company that acquired it in 2004.

The property is broken up into 28 paddocks and 14 holding paddocks with five sets of steel yards. About one third of the property lies within  of permanent water in the form of 26 bores and three dams. Approximately  of road exist within the property including  of the bitumen Buntine Highway.

Delamere is the Northern Territory's second oldest pastoral lease. Initially known as Glencoe Station, the lease was assigned in 1878 to Messrs Travers and Gibson who remained on the land until 1881 when they sold to Charles Fisher and Maurice Lyons. Fisher and Lyons paid cash for the  property stocked with 2,000 head of cattle. Fisher and Lyons later took up the lease for Victoria River Downs. The first cattle were overlanded from Aramac in Queensland by Nathaniel Buchanan In 1884 the property was stocked with approximately 7000 head of mixed cattle and 400 horses.

In 2002 Delamere was owned by a syndicate composed of four businessmen; Neville Walker, Leo Venturin, Henry Townshend and James Osbourne. The property sold later the same year for 15.25 million, the price included the 29,000 head of Brahman and Brahman cross cattle. The buyer was the Texas-based Tejas Land and Cattle Company, represented in Australia by Milton Jones.

See also
List of ranches and stations

References

Stations (Australian agriculture)
Pastoral leases in the Northern Territory
1878 establishments in Australia